Symphony No. 2 in D major, Op. 73, was composed by Johannes Brahms in the summer of 1877, during a visit to Pörtschach am Wörthersee, a town in the Austrian province of Carinthia. Its composition was brief in comparison with the 21 years it took Brahms to complete his First Symphony.

The symphony is scored for 2 flutes, 2 oboes, 2 clarinets, 2 bassoons, 4 horns, 2 trumpets, 3 trombones, tuba, timpani, and strings.

The cheery and almost pastoral mood of the symphony often invites comparisons with Beethoven's Sixth Symphony, but, perhaps mischievously, Brahms wrote to his publisher on 22 November 1877 that the symphony "is so melancholy that you will not be able to bear it. I have never written anything so sad, and the score must come out in mourning."

The premiere was given in Vienna on 30 December 1877 by the Vienna Philharmonic under the direction of Hans Richter; Walter Frisch notes that it had originally been scheduled for 9 December, but "in one of those little ironies of music history, it had to be postponed [because] the players were so preoccupied with learning Das Rheingold by Richard Wagner." A typical performance lasts between 40 and 50 minutes.

Movements

In the Second Symphony, Brahms preserved the structural principles of the classical symphony, in which two lively outer movements frame a slow second movement followed by a short scherzo:

I. Allegro non troppo

The cellos and double-basses start the first-movement sonata form in a tranquil mood by introducing the first phrase of the principal theme, which is continued by the horns. The woodwinds develop the section and other instruments join in gradually progressing to a full-bodied forte (at bar 58). At bar 82, the violas and cellos introduce the movement's second "Lullaby" theme in F-sharp minor, which eventually moves to A major. After a development section based mostly on motives of the principal theme group, the recapitulation begins at bar 302, with the second theme returning at bar 350. Towards the conclusion of the movement, Brahms marked bar 497 as in tempo, sempre tranquillo, and it is this mood which pervades the remainder of the movement as it closes in the home key of D major.

It is introduced at bar 82 and is continually brought back, reshaped and changed both rhythmically and harmonically.

II. Adagio non troppo

This movement is characterised by the use of developing variation. A brooding theme introduced by the cellos from bars 1 to 12, with a counter-melody in the bassoons, begins the second movement. A second theme, marked , appears in bar 33. After a brief development section, the recapitulation of the first theme (the second theme is absent) is highly modified. The movement then finishes with a coda-like section in which the main theme is reintroduced in the end.

III. Allegretto grazioso (quasi andantino)

The third movement minuet opens with pizzicato cellos accompanying a lilting oboe melody in G major. A contrasting section in  time marked Presto ma non assai begins in the strings, and this theme is soon taken over by the full orchestra (minus trumpets). Bar 107 returns to the main tempo and gentle mood, but the idyll setting is again disrupted in bar 126 when the earlier Presto marking makes a re-entry, this time in a  variation. Brahms yet again diverts the movement back into its principal tempo (bar 194) and thereafter to its peaceful close.

The third movement contains very light articulated sections, very similar in character to the Slavonic Dances of Brahms' contemporary, Dvořák. This lighter element provides a contrast to the previous two movements.

IV. Allegro con spirito

Mysterious sotto voce strings open the final Allegro con spirito, again in sonata form. The full orchestra suddenly announces the arrival of the main theme, unveiling "...the blazing sunrise of the most athletic and ebulliently festive movement Brahms ever wrote". As the initial excitement fades, violins introduce a new subject in A major marked largamente (to be played broadly). The wind instruments repeat this until it develops into a climax. Bar 155 of the movement repeats the symphony's first subject again, but instead of the joyful outburst heard earlier, Brahms introduces the movement's development section. A mid-movement tranquillo section (bar 206, and reappearing in the coda) elaborates earlier material and slows down the movement to allow a buildup of energy into the recapitulation. The first theme comes in again (bar 244) and the familiar orchestral forte is played. The second theme also reappears in the tonic key. Towards the end of the symphony, descending chords and a mazy run of notes by various instruments of the orchestra (bars 395 to 412) sound out the second theme again but this time drowned out in a blaze of brass instruments as the symphony ends in a triumphant mood.

Notes

Further reading
Pascall, Robert and Michael Struck (October–December 2003). Die Musikforschung, vol. 56, no. 4, pp. 382–390.
Schachter, Carl (March 1983). "The First Movement of Brahms's Second Symphony: The Opening Theme and Its Consequences." Music Analysis, vol. 2, no. 1, pp. 55–68.

External links 

 
Detailed listening guide using the 1989 Deutsche Grammophon recording DG 435 683-2 by the Berlin Philharmonic, conducted by Claudio Abbado
"Deep Listen: Brahms Second Symphony" by Matthew Lorenzon, ABC Classic, 1 May 2018, with excerpts performed by the West Australian Symphony Orchestra, conducted by Asher Fisch
Autograph manuscript of first movement, The Juilliard Manuscript Collection

Symphonies by Johannes Brahms
1877 compositions
Compositions in D major